Srobotnik may refer to several places in Slovenia:

 Srobotnik, Dolenjske Toplice, a former settlement in the Municipality of Dolenjske Toplice
 Srobotnik ob Kolpi, a settlement in the Municipality of Kostel
 Srobotnik pri Velikih Laščah, a settlement in the Municipality of Velike Lašče